Fortuné Hippolyte Auguste Abraham-Dubois (11 September 1821 – 26 February 1891), under the nom de plume Fortuné du Boisgobey, was a French novelist.

Life 

Fortuné du Boisgobey was born at Granville (Manche), and graduated from the Lycée Saint-Louis. He served as paymaster to the Army of Africa through several campaigns in Algeria from 1844 to 1848. His parents were wealthy, yet at forty or upwards, he took to writing.

In 1843, using the name Fortuné Abraham-Dubois, he made his literary debut in the Journal d'Avranches with a series entitled Lettres de Sicile recounting a voyage he had taken the year before. His first successful novel, Les Deux comédiens appeared in 1868, under the du Boisgobey pen name in the Petit Journal. 
The story was popular, and M. Paul Dalloz of the Petit Moniteur signed a contract with the author for seven years at 12,000ƒ a year. His reputation was increased by the publication of Une Affaire mystérieuse and Le Forçat colonel, both published there in 1869. 
In 1877, Figaro engaged him for a series of novels, which increased the success of that paper. 
He was prolific, with more than sixty works to his name, and became one of the most popular feuilleton writers.
In 1885 and 1886 he was President of the Committee of the Société des gens de lettres. Du Boisgobey died in 1891 after a long illness.

Works 

Du Boisgobey was the chief of the followers of Émile Gaboriau, with whom his name is generally associated. He even wrote a sequel, La Vieillesse de M. Lecoq, using Gaboriau's character Monsieur Lecoq in 1877-78. His novels deal with crime, the police, and Parisian life. They had a high circulation, and the greater part of them have been translated into English.

English translations exist for the following works.

 Le Forçat colonel (1871) - 
 Le Chevalier Casse-Cou (1873) - The Chevalier Casse-Cou / 
 Le Camélia rouge - The Red Camelia
 La Chasse aux ancêtres - The Search for Ancestors
 Le Vrai Masque de fer (1873) - The Iron Mask
 L’As de cœur (1875) - 
 La Tresse blonde (1875) - 
 Le Coup de pouce (1875) - 
 Les Mystères du nouveau Paris (1876) - The Mysteries of New Paris
 L'Enragé (1876) - Marie-Rose; or, The Mystery
 "La Jambe Noire" (1877) - 
 Une Affaire mystérieuse (1878) - 
 La Vieillesse de M. Lecoq (1878) - 
 Première partie - The Old Age of Monsieur Lecoq
 Deuxième partie - The Nabob of Bahour
 L'Épingle rose (1879) - 
 Première partie - The Coral Pin
 Deuxième partie - The Temple of Death
 L'Héritage de Jean Tourniol (1879) - The Robbery of the Orphans; or, Jean Tourniol's Inheritance
 Le Crime de l'Opéra ou "La Rideau Sanglante" (1879) - The Crime of the Opera House /     The Opera-House Tragedy
 
 
 La Main coupée (1880) -  / 
 Première partie - The Countess Yalta; or, The Nihilist Spy
 Deuxième partie - Doctor Villagos; or, The Nihilist Chief
 Où est Zénobie? (1880) - Where's Zenobia? / Zénobie Capitaine
 
 
 Le Tambour de Montmirail (1880) - 
 L'Affaire Matapan (1881) -  / The Matapan Jewels
 L'Équipage du diable (1881) -  / Satan's Coach
 Le Crime de l'omnibus (1881) -  / The Crime in the Omnibus
 Le Pavé de Paris (1881) - 
 Les Deux bonnets verts (1881) -  / Mérindol
 Le Pignon maudit (1882) -  / The Privateersman's Legacy
 Le Bac (1882) -  / Was it a Murder? or, Who is the Heir? / The Ferry-Boat / Article 722; or, Roger's Inheritance
 Les Suites d'un duel (1882) - 
 La Revanche de Fernande (1882) - 
 Le Cochon d'or (1882) - 
 Bouche cousue (1883) - Sealed Lips
 Le Collier d'acier (1883) - 
 Le Coup d'œil de M. Piédouche (1883) -  / The Parisian Detective / Piedouche, a French Detective / The Severed Head; or, A Terrible Confession
 Le Billet rouge (1884) -  / Lover or Blackmailer?
 Le Mari de la diva (1884) - 
 Le Secret de Berthe (1884) - 
 Première partie - Bertha's Secret
 Deuxième partie - The Countess de Marcenac
 Babiole (1884) - 
 Première partie - 
 Deuxième partie - The Victim of Destiny
 Margot la Balafrée (1884) -  / The Vitriol Thrower
 Première partie - The Sculptor's Daughter
 Deuxième partie - The Count's Ring
 La Voilette bleue (1885) -  / The Angel of the Belfry / The Blue Veil; or, The Crime of the Tower
 Le Cri du sang (1885) -  / 
 Le Pouce crochu (1885) -  / Zig-Zag the Clown; or, The Steel Gauntlets
 La Belle geôlière (1885) - 
 La Bande rouge (1886) - 
 Première partie - The Red Band
 Deuxième partie - Scarlet Mystery / The Mystery of the Oak
 Porte close (1886) -  / The Closed Door
 Rubis sur l'ongle (1886) - 
 Cœur volant (1886) - 
 "Le Gredins" (1887)
 
  
 Jean Coup-en-deux (1887) - 
 Cornaline la Dompteuse (1887) - 
 L'Œil-de-chat (1888) - The Cat's-Eye Ring: A Secret of Paris Life
 Grippe-Soleil (1887) - The Bride of a Day: a Story of Paris Life
 Le Chalet des Pervenches (1888) - 
 Mariage d'inclination (1888) - 
 Le plongeur: scènes de la vie sportive (1889) - The High Roller; or, Plunging and Honeyfugling on the Race-Track: A Sporting Romance
 Fontenay Coup-d'Epée (1890) - 
 Le Chêne-Capitaine (1890) - In Chase of Crime
 Un Cadet de Normandie au XVIIe siècle (1891) - An Ocean Knight; or, The Corsairs and their Conquerors
 Acquittée (1892) -

Notes

References 

 "Notes". The Critic 15 (375): 131. 1891-03-07.
 Chevrier, Thierry (1997). "Dossier: Fortuné du Boisgobey" (in French). Le Rocambole 1 (1): 23-74. 0765-0507.
 Moon, George Washington (1891). Men and Women of the Time. London: George Routledge and Sons. pp. 278.
 Lai, Rick (2004). "THE MONSIEUR LECOQ CHRONOLOGY". "THE MONSIEUR LECOQ CHRONOLOGY". Retrieved 2010-06-19.

External links 
 
 

1821 births
1891 deaths
People from Manche
Lycée Saint-Louis alumni
19th-century French novelists
French male novelists
19th-century French male writers